In molecular biology mir-636 microRNA is a short RNA molecule. MicroRNAs function to regulate the expression levels of other genes by several mechanisms.

miR-636 and MDS
miR-636 has been identified as one of three key miRNAs associated with the anti-ageing myelodysplastic syndromes (MDS). Its levels correspond to high discrimination between MDS and normal controls, and expression is decreased in MDS. In this way it can be used as a potential diagnostic marker for MDS.

Glucocorticoid resistance
Resistance to glucocorticoids (GC) used in the treatment of blood-related malignancies greatly impairs their clinical utility. The active glucocorticoid receptor GR-α is required for an effective response to GCs, but this is significantly downregulated in GC-resistant cell lines MM.1Re and MM.1RL. miR-636 has been found to be differentially expressed between GC-sensitive and GC-resistant MM.1 cell lines. It has therefore been identified as a possible candidate responsible for postranscriptional silencing of GR-α in GC-resistant cells.

See also 
 MicroRNA

References

External links
 

MicroRNA
MicroRNA precursor families